The 1960 Summer Olympics, officially known as the Games of the XVII Olympiad and commonly known as Rome 1960, were an international multi-sport event held from 25 August to 11 September 1960 in Rome, Italy. Rome had previously been awarded the administration of the 1908 Summer Olympics, but following the eruption of Mount Vesuvius in 1906, the city had no choice but to decline and pass the honour to London. The Soviet Union won the most gold and overall medals at the 1960 Games.

The 1st Paralympic Games were held in Rome in conjunction with the 1960 Summer Olympics, marking the first time such events coincided.

Host city selection
On 15 June 1955, at the 50th IOC Session in Paris, France, Rome won the rights to host the 1960 Games, having beaten Brussels, Mexico City, Tokyo, Detroit, Budapest and finally Lausanne. Tokyo and Mexico City would subsequently host the proceeding 1964 and 1968 Summer Olympics respectively.

Toronto was initially interested in the bidding, but appears to have dropped out during the final phase of the bid process. This was the first of five unsuccessful attempts by Toronto to secure the Summer Olympics from then until the 2008 Games.

Highlights

 Swedish sprint canoeist Gert Fredriksson won his sixth Olympic title.
 Fencer Aladár Gerevich of Hungary won his sixth consecutive gold medal in the team sabre event.
 The Japanese men's gymnastics team won the first of five successive golds (see 1976 Summer Olympics).
 The United States men's national basketball team—led by promising college players Walt Bellamy, Jerry Lucas, Oscar Robertson and Jerry West—captured its fifth straight Olympic gold medal.
 Danish sailor Paul Elvstrøm won his fourth straight gold medal in the Finn class. Others to emulate his performance in an individual event are Al Oerter, Carl Lewis, Michael Phelps, Kaori Icho, Mijaín López and, if the Intercalated (Interspaced) Games of 1906 are included, Ray Ewry.
 German Armin Hary won the 100 metres in an Olympic record time of 10.2 seconds.
 Wilma Rudolph, a former polio patient, won three gold medals in sprint events on the track. She was acclaimed as "the fastest woman in the world".
 Jeff Farrell won two gold medals in swimming.  He underwent an emergency appendectomy six days before the Olympic Trials.

 Abebe Bikila of Ethiopia won the marathon barefooted to become the first black African Olympic champion.
 Cassius Clay, later known as Muhammad Ali, won boxing's light-heavyweight gold medal. Ramon "Buddy" Carr was his coach.
 Herb Elliott of Australia won the men's 1500 meters in one of the most dominating performances in Olympic history.
 Rafer Johnson defeated his rival, fellow U.C.L.A. Bruin and friend C.K. Yang in one of the greatest Decathlon events in Olympic history.
 Lance Larson of the United States was controversially denied a 100 metres freestyle swimming gold, despite showing the best time.
 16-years-old phenom Chris von Saltza won four medals in women's swimming, three of them gold.
 The future Constantine II, last King of Greece (abdicated and ended hybrid monarchy, 1973) won his country a gold in sailing: dragon class.
 The Pakistani Men's Field Hockey team broke a run of Indian team victories since 1928, defeating India in the final and winning Pakistan's first Olympic gold medal.
 Wrestlers Shelby Wilson, and Doug Blubaugh, who wrestled together growing up, won gold medals in their respective weight classes.

Lowlights
 Danish cyclist Knud Jensen collapsed during the 100km team race because of heat stroke and later died in the hospital. It was suspected that he had been under the influence of Roniacol, a blood circulation stimulant. The International Olympic Committee stated on its website that "drugs were implicated, although that was never proven." It was the second time (and as of 2021, the most recent) an athlete died in competition at the Olympics, after the death of Portuguese marathon runner Francisco Lázaro at the 1912 Summer Olympics.

Historical landmarks
 South Africa appeared in the Olympic arena for the last time under its apartheid regime. It would not be allowed to return until 1992, by when apartheid in sport was being abolished.
 Singapore competed for the first time under its own flag, which was to become its national flag after independence, as the British had granted it self-government a year earlier. Tan Howe Liang won silver in the Weightlifting lightweight category, which was the first time (and the only time until 2008) that an athlete from Singapore won an Olympic medal.

Non-medal winners
 Finnish Vilho Ylönen, a field shooter, shot a bullseye to a wrong target, and in so doing he dropped from second place to fourth.
 Peter Camejo, a 2004 American vice-presidential candidate for the Green Party, competed in yachting for Venezuela.
 The future Queen Sofía of Spain represented her native Greece in sailing events.

Broadcasting
 CBS paid  for the exclusive right to broadcast the Games in the United States.  This was the first Summer Olympic games to be telecast in North America.  In addition to CBS in the United States, the Olympics were telecast for the first time in Canada (on CBC Television) and in Mexico (through the networks of Telesistema Mexicano). Since television broadcast satellites were still two years into the future, CBS, CBC, and TSM shot and edited videotapes in Rome, fed the tapes to Paris where they were re-recorded onto other tapes which were then loaded onto jet planes to North America. Planes carrying the tapes landed at Idlewild Airport in New York City, where mobile units fed the tapes to CBS, to Toronto for the CBC, and to Mexico City for TSM. Despite this arrangement, many daytime events were broadcast in North America, especially on CBS and CBC, the same day they took place.

Venues

Olympic Stadium2 (Stadio Olimpico) – opening/closing ceremonies, athletics, equestrian events
Flaminio Stadium1 (Stadio Flaminio) – football finals
Swimming Stadium1 – swimming, diving, water polo, modern pentathlon (swimming)
Sports Palace1 (Palazzo dello sport) – basketball, boxing
Olympic Velodrome1 – cycling (track), field hockey
Small Sports Palace1 (Palazzetto dello Sport) – basketball, weightlifting
Marble Stadium2 (Stadio dei Marmi) – field hockey preliminaries
Baths of Caracalla – gymnastics
Basilica of Maxentius – wrestling
Palazzo dei Congressi – fencing
Umberto I Shooting Range1 – modern pentathlon (shooting), shooting (pistol/ rifle)
Roses Swimming Pool1 (Piscina delle Rose) – water polo
Lake Albano, Castelgandolfo – rowing, canoeing
Piazza di Siena, Villa Borghese gardens – equestrian (dressage, eventing – jumping, jumping – individual)
Pratoni del Vivaro, Rocca di Papa – equestrian (eventing)
Gulf of Naples, Naples – yachting
Communal Stadium, Florence – football/soccer preliminaries
Communal Stadium, Grosseto – football/soccer preliminaries
Communal Stadium, L'Aquila – football/soccer preliminaries
Ardenza Stadium, Livorno – football/soccer preliminaries
Adriatico Stadium, Pescara – football/soccer preliminaries
Saint Paul's Stadium, Naples – football/soccer preliminaries
Campo Tre Fontane – field hockey preliminaries
Acqua Santa Golf Club Course – modern pentathlon (running)
Arch of Constantine – athletics (marathon finish)
Cesano Infantry School Range – shooting (300 m free rifle)
Lazio Pigeon Shooting Stand – shooting (trap shotgun)
Passo Corese – modern pentathlon (riding)
Grande Raccordo Anulare – athletics (marathon)
Via Appian Antica – athletics (marathon)
Via Cassia – cycling (individual road race)
Via Flaminia – cycling (individual road race)
Via Cristoforo Colombo – athletics (marathon), cycling (road team time trial)
Via di Grottarossa – cycling (individual road race)

1 New facilities constructed in preparation for the Olympic Games. 2 Existing facilities modified or refurbished in preparation for the Olympic Games.

Games

Participating National Olympic Committees

A total of 83 nations participated at the Rome Games. Athletes from Morocco, San Marino, Sudan, and Tunisia competed at the Olympic Games for the first time.
Athletes from Barbados, Jamaica and Trinidad and Tobago would represent the new (British) West Indies Federation, competing as "Antilles", but this nation would only exist for this single Olympiad. Athletes from Northern Rhodesia and Southern Rhodesia competed under the Rhodesia name while representing the Federation of Rhodesia and Nyasaland. Athletes from East Germany and West Germany would compete as the United Team of Germany from 1956 to 1964. Athletes from the People's Republic of China last competed at the 1952 Summer Games but had since withdrawn from the Olympic movement due to a dispute with the Republic of China over the right to represent China. The number in parentheses indicates the number of participants that each country contributed.

  also made its first Olympic appearance, but its lone athlete (Wim Esajas) withdrew from competition due to a scheduling error.

Sports
The 1960 Summer Olympics featured 17 different sports encompassing 23 disciplines, and medals were awarded in 150 events. In the list below, the number of events in each discipline is noted in parentheses.

Aquatics

Road (2)
Track (4)

 Dressage (1)
 Eventing (2)
 Jumping (2)

Freestyle (8)
Greco-Roman (8)

Calendar
All dates are in Central European Time (UTC+1)

Medal count

These are the top ten nations that won medals at the 1960 Games:

See also

 Universiades celebrated in Italy
 1959 Summer Universiade – Turin
 1966 Winter Universiade – Sestriere
 1970 Summer Universiade – Turin
 1975 Winter Universiade – Livigno
 1975 Summer Universiade – Rome
 1985 Winter Universiade – Belluno
 1997 Summer Universiade – Sicily
 2003 Winter Universiade – Tarvisio
 2007 Winter Universiade – Turin
 2013 Winter Universiade – Trentino
 2019 Summer Universiade – Naples
 2025 Winter Universiade – Turin
 Deaflympics celebrated in Italy
 1957 Summer Deaflympics – Milan
 2001 Summer Deaflympics – Rome
 2019 Winter Deaflympics – Province of Sondrio

References

External links

 Rome 1960: The Olympics That Changed the World, David Maraniss, New York, NY, U.S.: Simon & Schuster, 2008.
 The program of the 1960 Rome Olympics
 LIFE 12 Sep 1960

 
Sports competitions in Rome
Olympic Games in Italy
Olympics Games
Olympic Games
Summer Olympics by year
1960s in Rome
August 1960 sports events in Europe
September 1960 sports events in Europe